This is a list of television shows which feature dance as a central activity or theme.

Dance-related lists
Dance